Vaux-en-Bugey (literally Vaux in Bugey) is a commune in the Ain department in eastern France.

Population

Twin towns
Vaux-en-Bugey is twinned with:

  Redavalle, Italy

See also
Communes of the Ain department

References

Communes of Ain
Ain communes articles needing translation from French Wikipedia